Justin Leppitsch (born 1 October 1975) is a former professional Australian rules footballer and the former coach of the Brisbane Lions in the Australian Football League (AFL).

Early life
Leppitsch was raised in Berwick, Victoria. In 1992, he played in the newly established VSFL Under-18 competition (later known as the TAC Cup) with Southern Stingrays, where he was runner-up for the Morrish Medal, and caught the attention of Brisbane Bears talent scouts. He was selected by Brisbane at pick 4 in the 1992 AFL Draft.

AFL career
 He made his debut in 1993 for the Bears as a 17-year-old, but was then dropped back to play for West Brisbane where he hurt his knee and required a complete knee reconstruction. He was unable to play football for 15 months.

His breakout season was in 1999 under new coach Leigh Matthews, when he won the Brisbane Best and Fairest award, was selected as All-Australian for the first time and represented Australia in International Rules.

Under Matthews, Leppitsch became a key component of the Lions spine, playing centre half back in the club's three premiership sides from 2001 to 2003 and earned All-Australian status three times.

Late in his career, Leppitsch battled a chronic hamstring-related back injury which inevitably ended his career due to the resulting calf muscle wastage. He announced his immediate retirement from the AFL on 5 June 2006.

He was inducted into the Brisbane Lions Hall of Fame in 2012.

Coaching career

Assistant coaching roles
In October 2006, Leppitsch had accepted a position as an assistant coach with the Brisbane Lions. He later signed with Richmond to be an assistant coach in September 2009.

Brisbane Lions senior coach (2014-2016)
In September 2013, Leppitsch signed a three-year contract to be the senior coach of the Brisbane Lions. Leppitsch replaced Brisbane Lions caretaker senior coach Mark Harvey, who replaced Michael Voss after Voss stepped down during the 2013 season, after Voss was told that he would not receive a contract renewal as Brisbane Lions senior coach for the 2014 season.   

In Leppitsch's first season as Brisbane Lions senior coach in the 2014 season, the club under Leppitsch finished fifteenth (third-last) on the ladder with seven wins and fifteen losses. In the 2015 season, The Lions under Leppitsch, finished seventeenth (second-last) on the ladder with four wins and eighteen losses. In the 2016 season, The Lions under Leppitsch, finished seventeenth (second-last) on the ladder again for the second straight year in a row, this time with three wins and nineteen losses. Leppitsch coached Brisbane Lions to a total of  66 games with 14 wins and 52 losses to a winning percentage of 22 percent.     

On 29 August 2016, Leppitsch was sacked by the Lions as senior coach after three seasons with the club, at the end of the 2016 season. This occurred, despite being granted a one-year contract extension at the start of the year which would have seen him remain at the club until the end of the 2017 season. He was replaced by Chris Fagan as Brisbane Lions senior coach.

Return to Assistant coaching roles (2016-present)

Richmond Football Club
On 6 October 2016, Leppitsch returned to Richmond as an assistant coach. Twelve months after being sacked as senior coach of the Brisbane Lions, he played a major role in the club's 2017 AFL premiership win, coaching the forwards. He was also an assistant coach during Richmond's 2019 and 2020 premierships. Leppitsch announced that he would leave Richmond as an assistant coach at the end of the 2020 season.

Collingwood Football Club
In September 2021, Leppitsch joined the Collingwood Football Club in an assistant coaching role as Head of Strategy and defence under senior coach Craig McRae.

Statistics

Playing statistics

|-
|- style="background-color: #EAEAEA"
! scope="row" style="text-align:center" | 1993
|style="text-align:center;"|
| 23 || 4 || 4 || 2 || 27 || 12 || 39 || 3 || 5 || 1.0 || 0.5 || 6.8 || 3.0 || 9.8 || 0.8 || 1.3
|-
! scope="row" style="text-align:center" | 1994
|style="text-align:center;"|
| 23 || 4 || 5 || 4 || 19 || 5 || 24 || 5 || 1 || 1.3 || 1.0 || 4.8 || 1.3 || 6.0 || 1.3 || 0.3
|- style="background-color: #EAEAEA"
! scope="row" style="text-align:center" | 1995
|style="text-align:center;"|
| 23 || 17 || 4 || 8 || 96 || 54 || 150 || 48 || 17 || 0.2 || 0.5 || 5.6 || 3.2 || 8.8 || 2.8 || 1.0
|-
! scope="row" style="text-align:center" | 1996
|style="text-align:center;"|
| 23 || 19 || 45 || 23 || 152 || 49 || 201 || 57 || 18 || 2.4 || 1.2 || 8.0 || 2.6 || 10.6 || 3.0 || 0.9
|- style="background-color: #EAEAEA"
! scope="row" style="text-align:center" | 1997
|style="text-align:center;"|
| 23 || 22 || 50 || 38 || 186 || 63 || 249 || 97 || 20 || 2.3 || 1.7 || 8.5 || 2.9 || 11.3 || 4.4 || 0.9
|-
! scope="row" style="text-align:center" | 1998
|style="text-align:center;"|
| 23 || 16 || 26 || 17 || 145 || 52 || 197 || 64 || 19 || 1.6 || 1.1 || 9.1 || 3.3 || 12.3 || 4.0 || 1.2
|- style="background-color: #EAEAEA"
! scope="row" style="text-align:center" | 1999
|style="text-align:center;"|
| 23 || 25 || 14 || 12 || 242 || 86 || 328 || 129 || 30 || 0.6 || 0.5 || 9.7 || 3.4 || 13.1 || 5.2 || 1.2
|-
! scope="row" style="text-align:center" | 2000
|style="text-align:center;"|
| 23 || 22 || 11 || 12 || 207 || 127 || 334 || 125 || 29 || 0.5 || 0.5 || 9.4 || 5.8 || 15.2 || 5.7 || 1.3
|- style="background-color: #EAEAEA"
! scope="row" style="text-align:center;" | 2001
|style="text-align:center;"|
| 23 || 11 || 6 || 3 || 69 || 35 || 104 || 43 || 4 || 0.5 || 0.3 || 6.3 || 3.2 || 9.5 || 3.9 || 0.4
|-
! scope="row" style="text-align:center;" | 2002
|style="text-align:center;"|
| 23 || 23 || 12 || 10 || 208 || 82 || 290 || 115 || 32 || 0.5 || 0.4 || 9.0 || 3.6 || 12.6 || 5.0 || 1.4
|- style="background-color: #EAEAEA"
! scope="row" style="text-align:center;" | 2003
|style="text-align:center;"|
| 23 || 22 || 10 || 3 || 193 || 105 || 298 || 126 || 32 || 0.5 || 0.1 || 8.8 || 4.8 || 13.5 || 5.7 || 1.5
|-
! scope="row" style="text-align:center" | 2004
|style="text-align:center;"|
| 23 || 24 || 6 || 2 || 173 || 110 || 283 || 108 || 40 || 0.3 || 0.1 || 7.2 || 4.6 || 11.8 || 4.5 || 1.7
|- style="background-color: #EAEAEA"
! scope="row" style="text-align:center" | 2005
|style="text-align:center;"|
| 23 || 14 || 0 || 0 || 144 || 80 || 224 || 80 || 29 || 0.0 || 0.0 || 10.3 || 5.7 || 16.0 || 5.7 || 2.1
|-
! scope="row" style="text-align:center" | 2006
|style="text-align:center;"|
| 23 || 4 || 1 || 0 || 32 || 19 || 51 || 20 || 2 || 0.3 || 0.0 || 8.0 || 4.8 || 12.8 || 5.0 || 0.5
|- class="sortbottom"
! colspan=3| Career
! 227
! 194
! 134
! 1893
! 879
! 2772
! 1020
! 278
! 0.9
! 0.6
! 8.3
! 3.9
! 12.2
! 4.5
! 1.2
|}

Head coaching record

References

External links 

Justin Leppitsch at the Brisbane Lions website 

Brisbane Bears players
Brisbane Lions players
Brisbane Lions Premiership players
1975 births
Living people
All-Australians (AFL)
Victorian State of Origin players
Merrett–Murray Medal winners
Australian rules footballers from Melbourne
Dandenong Stingrays players
Brisbane Lions coaches
Australia international rules football team players
Australian people of Austrian descent
Three-time VFL/AFL Premiership players
People from Berwick, Victoria